The 2021 COSAFA Under-17 Championship was the 10th edition of the COSAFA U-17 Championship, a football tournament organized by the Council of Southern Africa Football Associations (COSAFA) involving teams from Southern Africa for players aged 17 and below. Lesotho hosted the tournament for the first time as an integrated part of the 2020 African Union Sports Council Games. Angola were the eventual winners for the second time.

Participating teams

Group stage

Group A

Group B

Knockout stage

Semi-finals

Third place

Final

Awards
Most Valuable Player:  Joseph Banda
Top Scorer:  Joseph Banda and  Masambiro Kalua (5 each)
Top Goalkeeper:  Domingos Da Silva
Fair Play: 

Source:

References

External links
 Official website

COSAFA Under-17 Championship
International association football competitions hosted by South Africa
2021 in African football